Ludești is a commune in Dâmbovița County, Muntenia, Romania with a population of 5,100 people. It is composed of six villages: Ludești, Miloșari, Potocelu, Scheiu de Jos, Scheiu de Sus and Telești.

References

Communes in Dâmbovița County
Localities in Muntenia